James M. Young was a state legislator in Mississippi. He represented Panola County, Mississippi in the Mississippi House of Representatives in 1878 and 1879.

In 1884 he was accused of shooting Alfred Fields. In 1885, Fields was accused of attempting to bribe Young.

See also
 African-American officeholders during and following the Reconstruction era

References

Year of birth missing
Members of the Mississippi House of Representatives